Cruciata glabra, smooth crosswort, is a species of flowering plant in the genus Cruciata, native to Morocco, Algeria, southern, central and eastern Europe, the Caucasus, Kazakhstan, the Altai, and western Siberia. It is often found in beech (Fagus sylvatica) forests.

Subspecies
The following subspecies are currently accepted:

Cruciata glabra subsp. balcanica (Ehrend.) Soó
Cruciata glabra subsp. glabra
Cruciata glabra subsp. hirticaulis (Beck) Natali & Jeanm.
Cruciata glabra subsp. krylovii (Iljin) E.G.Naumova

References

Cruciata glabra
Plants described in 1852